Le Méridien Hong Kong, Cyberport is a 170-room hotel forming part of the Cyberport digital community development in Hong Kong's Telegraph Bay, in Southern District. It opened in 20 April 2004 and is operated by Le Méridien, a design-focused brand of Marriott International.

Le Méridien was awarded a 10-year management contract for this hotel to be built at the Cyberport complex. The hotel has been listed by British newspaper The Independent as one of the five best "hi-tech hotels".

See also
List of buildings and structures in Hong Kong

References

External links

Le Meridien Cyberport website

Hotels in Hong Kong
Telegraph Bay
Hongkong Land
Hotels established in 2004
Hotel buildings completed in 2004
Southern District, Hong Kong